Paul Wasserman (July 30, 1934 – November 18, 2007) was a prominent entertainment publicist.

He represented musical artists such as U2, Paul Simon, The Who, Neil Diamond, James Taylor, Tom Petty, Linda Ronstadt, The Rolling Stones and Bob Dylan. Wasserman also represented movie stars such as George C. Scott, Lee Marvin, Jack Nicholson, Dennis Hopper and Jack Lemmon.  

Mr. Wasserman also served as the publicist for the U2: Rattle and Hum movie as well as the movie, Colors

In 2000 Wasserman was jailed for one felony count of grand theft, using the names of his clients to help him sell bogus stock options. Wasserman pleaded guilty in Los Angeles Superior Court in 2000. The judge accepted Mr. Wasserman's plea and he was ordered to pay restitution of almost $87,000. Wasserman was also sentenced to 6 months in jail, 5 years of probation.

Notes

1934 births
2007 deaths
American people convicted of theft
American people convicted of fraud
American public relations people